PEAB Arena is an indoor arena in Nyköping, Sweden. Its current capacity is 5,500 and it was built in 2003. It was the home arena of the Nyköpings Hockey ice hockey team. It has been named after the construction company PEAB.

See also
Rosvalla Nyköping Eventcenter

External links
PEAB Arena on nykopingshockey.se
Peabhallen on rosvalla.se
Pictures and facts (unofficial)

Indoor ice hockey venues in Sweden
Ice hockey venues in Sweden

sv:PEAB Arena